The 2018–19 Eastern Washington Eagles Women's basketball team represents Eastern Washington University during the 2018–19 NCAA Division I women's basketball season. The Eagles were led by eighteenth year head coach Wendy Schuller and play their home games at Reese Court. They were members of the Big Sky Conference. They finished the season 13–20, 9–11 in Big Sky play to finish in a tie for sixth place. They advanced to the championship game of the Big Sky women's tournament where they lost to Portland State.

Roster

Schedule

|-
!colspan=8 style=| Exhibition

|-
!colspan=8 style=| Non-conference regular season

|-
!colspan=8 style=| Big Sky regular season

|-
!colspan=9 style=| Big Sky Women's Tournament

See also
 2018–19 Eastern Washington Eagles men's basketball team

References

Eastern Washington Eagles women's basketball seasons
Eastern Washington
Eastern Washington
Eastern Washington